Karolinenkoog is a municipality in the district of Dithmarschen, in Schleswig-Holstein, Germany.

In 1800 the municipality was named after the polder, which was named in honour of Princess Caroline of Denmark.

References

Municipalities in Schleswig-Holstein
Dithmarschen
Koogs